Dirty Love is a 2005 American romantic comedy film written by and starring Jenny McCarthy and directed by John Mallory Asher. At the time of filming, McCarthy and Asher were married; they divorced the month the film was released. Playing heavily off McCarthy's reputation for toilet humor, the film received overwhelmingly negative reviews from critics and was a box-office bomb; it also received the Golden Raspberry Award for Worst Picture, as well as Worst Screenplay, Worst Director, and Worst Actress for McCarthy.

Plot
Struggling photographer Rebecca Sommers finds her model boyfriend Richard in bed with another woman. Her life falls apart, and she alternates between desire for revenge upon him, sexual promiscuity, and abandonment of all hope of love. Her best friends, Michelle and Carrie, try to set her up on dates. These include one with a freakish magician and another with a man who gives her ecstasy and has a fetish for fish. She attempts to make Richard jealous by taking a director, who is reminiscent of Woody Allen, to a runway show, but he ends up vomiting on her breasts in front of everyone.

Ultimately, Rebecca realizes she should focus her energy on being with someone who truly loves her, and that turns out to be John, her nerdy but caring best male friend who has been supportive of her through the entire ordeal.

Cast
 Jenny McCarthy as Rebecca Sommers
 Eddie Kaye Thomas as John
 Carmen Electra as Michelle López
 Victor Webster as Richard
 Kam Heskin as Carrie Winters
 Deryck Whibley as Tony
 Guillermo Díaz as Tom Houdini

Cast notes:
 Deryck Whibley's band, Sum 41, makes a cameo appearance performing their song "No Reason".

Release

Box office
Dirty Love opened theatrically on September 23, 2005, in 44 venues and earned $23,281 in its opening weekend. The film ended its run two weeks later, on October 6, 2005, having grossed a mere $36,099 in the domestic box office.

Critical response
The film received extremely negative reviews from critics. On review aggregation website Rotten Tomatoes, it has a rating of 6% based on 31 reviews, with an average rating of 2.80/10. The site's consensus states: "The laugh-free Dirty Love is a comedy dead zone -- it's aggressively crude and shoddily constructed." Metacritic reports a 9 out of 100 rating, based on reviews from 12 critics, indicating "overwhelming dislike".

Film critic Roger Ebert of the Chicago Sun-Times gave a rare zero star rating and said it was the third-worst film of 2005. In his written review, he stated, "Here is a film so pitiful, it doesn't rise to the level of badness. It is hopelessly incompetent." Stephen Holden of The New York Times gave the film 0/5 stars, writing: "Even by the standards of its bottom-feeding genre, "Dirty Love" clings to the gutter like a rat in garbage."

Not all reviews were negative. Oz of eFilmCritic gave the film 3/5 and said "Dirty Love is a surprisingly good effort that will fall short only because of poor direction, poor editing, and the stigma of the lead having only previously been involved in crap." 
Jeremy C. Fox of Pajiba said that although the film is not for everyone, "Dirty Love is in the worst possible taste. It has crossed the Himalayas of bad taste and come out the other side. And for that reason, if no other, I kinda love it." He concludes, "The response to Dirty Love says less about the movie than it does the bullying, herd-following nature of most movie critics."

Awards and honors

See also
 List of American films of 2005

References

External links
 
 
 
 

 

2005 films
2000s English-language films
2005 romantic comedy films
American independent films
American romantic comedy films
American sex comedy films
Films set in Los Angeles
Films shot in Los Angeles
2000s sex comedy films
2005 independent films
Golden Raspberry Award winning films
2000s American films